Ekaterina Valerievna Korbut (born February 9, 1985 in Tashkent) is a Russian chess player, who holds the titles of International master and Woman Grandmaster.
She won the World Junior Chess Championship (Girls) in 2004, and the Russian women's championship in 2006.

She competed in the Women's World Chess Championship 2006 but went out to Anna Ushenina in the first round. She qualified for the 2008 championship but did not take part.

She has played no serious chess since 2008; according to her friend Ekaterina Atalik she married and had a daughter, and is now focused on her family life.

References

External links 

 
 

1985 births
Living people
Chess International Masters
Chess woman grandmasters
World Junior Chess Champions
Sportspeople from Tashkent
Russian female chess players